

Brokskat
or Minaro
is an endangered Indo-Aryan language spoken by the Brokpa people  in the lower Indus Valley of Ladakh and its surrounding areas.
It is  the oldest surviving member of the ancient Dardic language. It is considered a divergent variety  of Shina, but it is not mutually intelligible with the other dialects of Shina. It is only spoken by  2858 people in Ladakh and 400 people in the adjoining Baltistan, part of Pakistan-administered Kashmir.

Endomym

Vocabulary

Verb tenses

References

Dardic languages
Languages of Ladakh
Languages of Pakistan
Languages of Gilgit-Baltistan
Languages of India